The following lists events that happened during 1879 in Australia.

Incumbents

Governors
Governors of the Australian colonies:
Governor of New South Wales – Sir Hercules Robinson (until 19 March), then Sir Augustus Loftus
Governor of Queensland – Sir Arthur Kennedy
Governor of South Australia – Sir William Jervois
Governor of Tasmania – Frederick Weld
Governor of Victoria – Sir George Bowen (until 22 February), then George Phipps, 2nd Marquess of Normanby
Governor of Western Australia – Major General The Hon. Sir Harry Ord GCMG CB RE

Premiers
Premiers of the Australian colonies:
Premier of New South Wales – Sir Henry Parkes
Premier of Queensland – John Douglas (until 21 January), then Thomas McIlwraith
Premier of South Australia – William Morgan
Premier of Tasmania – William Crowther (until 30 October), then William Giblin
Premier of Victoria – Graham Berry

Events
8 February – Bushranger Ned Kelly and his gang raid the town of Jerilderie, New South Wales, locking up the town's two policemen, stealing their uniforms, cutting the telegraph lines and robbing the bank. Kelly also pens the famous Jerilderie Letter.
19 February – The foundation stone is laid and construction begins on the Royal Exhibition Building in Carlton, Victoria.
6 March  – The town of Cleve, South Australia is officially gazetted.
17 March – The Municipality of Canterbury is proclaimed.
14 April – The first use of a parachute in Australia occurs when Henri L 'Estrange's balloon ruptures above Melbourne's Agricultural Showgrounds.
21 April – From 1879 the eight-hour day was a public holiday in Victoria; it celebrated the stonemasons' strike in 1856.
26 April – Seventy square kilometres of land in Sydney's Sutherland Shire is proclaimed The National Park (later the Royal National Park).
1 July – The Daily Telegraph newspaper is first published in Sydney.
17 September – The Sydney International Exhibition opens at the Garden Palace.
13 November – Bushranger Captain Moonlite take thirty hostages at a farm near Gundagai, New South Wales. A shoot-out with police ensues, resulting in the death of a policeman and two members of Moonlite's gang.

Exploration and settlement
1 August – Queensland annexes the Torres Strait Islands.
3 September – The town of Cunnamulla, Queensland is founded as a coach stop for Cobb & Co stagecoaches.

Arts and literature

 Australian bushranger Ned Kelly dictates the document that later became known as The Jerilderie Letter.

Sport
 8 February – A controversial umpiring decision at an international cricket match results in the Sydney Riot of 1879.
 4 November – Darriwell wins the Melbourne Cup.

Births
22 February – Norman Lindsay (died 1969), artist and writer
10 May – James Alexander Allan (died 1967), poet
22 May – Warwick Armstrong (died 1947), cricketer
19 June – James Muir Auld (died 1942), artist
26 June – Charles Leslie Barrett (died 1959), naturalist, journalist, author and ornithologist
24 July – Robert Clyde Packer (died 1934), founder of the Packer media dynasty
15 September – Joseph Lyons (died 1939), Premier of Tasmania and 10th Prime Minister of Australia
14 October – Miles Franklin (died 1954), writer
18 November – CE.W. Bean (died 1968), war journalist
26 November – Denis Lutge (died 1953), rugby footballer
27 November – Chris McKivat (died 1941), rugby footballer and coach

Deaths
 15 May – George Fife Angas, Businessman and politician (b. 1789)
 21 November – Sir Archibald Burt, first Chief Justice of Western Australia (b. 1810)

References

 
Australia
Years of the 19th century in Australia